{{DISPLAYTITLE:NZR WE class}}

The NZR WE Class were rebuilt from earlier Addington built B class locomotives. In service, the first two were tried on the Rimutaka Incline, however, they lacked the required adhesion on the 1 in 15 (6.67%) grade. They were later transferred to Greymouth for use on the Rewanui Incline, where they were far more successful, on the line's 1 in 25 (4%) grade. It is not known if they ever operated on the Roa Incline.

The three We class locomotives lasted until 1964.

See also
 NZR W class
 NZR WA class
 NZR WB class
 NZR WD class
 NZR WF class
 NZR WG class
 NZR WW class
 NZR WS / WAB class
 Locomotives of New Zealand

References

Bibliography 

 

WE class
Scrapped locomotives
Railway locomotives introduced in 1902
3 ft 6 in gauge locomotives of New Zealand